Hans Cappelen (18 December 1903 – 21 October 1979 ) was a Norwegian jurist, businessperson and resistance fighter.

He was born at Kviteseid in Telemark, Norway. He was a son of  Supreme Court Attorney Didrik Cappelen (1873–1941) and Antoinette Therese von der Lippe (1876–1934). He was a brother of the jurist and politician Didrik Cappelen and the actress and singer Linge Langård.

He held a degree in law and worked  in senior positions in the Philips Group and was a member of the board of Norsk AS Philips. 
Under the German occupation of Norway during World War II, he was arrested and sent to prison. He published the memoir Vi ga oss ikke (Nasjonalforlaget, 1945) and was a Norwegian witness in the Nuremberg trials in 1946. He was decorated Knight, First Class of the Order of St. Olav in 1970.

References

External links
Portrait of Hans Cappelen (Oslo Museum)
 Hans Cappelen: Vi ga oss ikke - En Nacht und Nebelfange forteller, Oslo 1945  
 Yale Law School: The Avalon Project, "Nuremberg Trial Proceedings", Vol. 6 
 SWR2 Stand 22.9.2016: Die Nürnberger Prozesse in Originalaufnahmen, "Nürnberg: Hans Cappelen berichtet über die Gestapo-Folter"   

1903 births
People from Kviteseid
Norwegian jurists
20th-century Norwegian businesspeople
Norwegian resistance members
Norwegian torture victims
Norwegian people imprisoned abroad
Natzweiler-Struthof concentration camp survivors
Norwegian World War II memoirists
Hans
1979 deaths